Westerhoff is a surname. Notable people with the surname include:

 Gay-Yee Westerhoff (born 1973), Chinese-English cellist
 Hans Westerhoff (born 1953), Dutch biologist and biochemist
 Jan Westerhoff, American philosopher and Orientalist

See also
 Westerhof